is a former Japanese football player.

Playing career
Nishikawa was born in Fukuoka Prefecture on June 12, 1974. After graduating from high school, he joined Yokohama Marinos in 1993. However he could not play at all in the match until 1994. On September 6, 1995, he debuted as forward against Sanfrecce Hiroshima. Although Marinos won the champions in J1 League, he could only play this match and retired end of 1995 season.

Club statistics

References

External links

1974 births
Living people
Association football people from Fukuoka Prefecture
Japanese footballers
J1 League players
Yokohama F. Marinos players
Association football forwards